Sir John Grenfell Crawford  (4 April 1910 – 28 October 1984) was an agricultural economist and a key architect of Australia's post-war growth.

Early life, education and family
Born in Hurstville, Sydney, Crawford was the tenth of twelve children of Henry Crawford and Harriet Isabel Crawford, née Wood. Crawford was educated at Sydney Boys High School and the University of Sydney.

Crawford married Jessie Morgan on 18 May 1935 and together they had a daughter.

Career
In 1941 Crawford helped to create the Agricultural Economics Section of the New South Wales Government's Department of Agriculture.

In 1942 he began working at the Department of War Organisation of Industry, before being appointed Director of Research at the Department of Post-War Reconstruction in 1943. In 1945 he was appointed inaugural Director of the Bureau of Agricultural Economics, followed by Secretary of the Department of Commerce and Agriculture (later Department of Trade), and then Secretary of the Department of Trade, where he played an important role in forging new trade relationships with the United Kingdom and Japan.

He helped to establish the Australian Development Assistance Agency (now Australian Aid), the Industries Assistance Commission, and Consultative Group on International Agricultural Research. He was also an adviser to the World Bank, Washington D.C., and Director, Australian Japanese Economic Research Project.

Crawford was a founding member and inaugural chair of the Australian Centre for International Agricultural Research, a statutory authority focusing on improving sustainable production in developing countries. He was also first chair of the Technical Advisory Committee to CGIAR (formerly Consultative Group for International Agricultural Research) from 1971 to 1976.

Crawford held several positions at the Australian National University: Director of the Research School of Pacific Studies (1960-1967); Vice-Chancellor (1968-1973); and then Chancellor of the University (1976–1984).

Recognition and awards
Crawford was knighted in 1959.

He was the second president of the Australian Agricultural Economics Society, and in 1983 was made an honorary life member.

He was named Australian of the Year in 1981.

In 2009, a street in the Canberra suburb of Casey was named John Crawford Crescent in Crawford's honour.

Legacy at ANU
The Crawford School of Public Policy is named after Crawford, and the school runs the annual Crawford Leadership Forum, opened by the J. G. Crawford Oration. It is also hosts the Sir John G Crawford Chair in Agricultural Economics.

The J.G. Crawford Prize was established by ANU in 1973, as Crawford was ending his term as vice-chancellor, in recognition of his contribution to the university. PhD Graduate students are nominated by college deans, and two (one for the natural sciences and one for social sciences/ humanities) and occasionally a third (for interdisciplinary work) are selected on the basis of academic excellence by a committee.

Partnered by the Department of Foreign Affairs and Trade and the  Crawford Fund, the project won an ARC Linkage Grant worth . A biography will be written by historian Nicholas Brown, while Frank Bongiorno is also involved in the project.

Crawford Fund
The Crawford Fund, a body established in Australia to support international agricultural research was also named in his honour. The fund awards the annual Sir John Crawford Fellowship to support scientists from developing countries, and since 1985 has hosted the Sir John Crawford Memorial Address. Notable speakers include Ross Garnaut, Frances Adamson, Catherine Bertini, Florence Chenoweth, Craig Venter, Shridath Ramphal and Robert McNamara.

References

External links

1910 births
1984 deaths
People from Sydney
Australian Commanders of the Order of the British Empire
Australian public servants
Australian Knights Bachelor
Companions of the Order of Australia
Australian of the Year Award winners
20th-century Australian economists
Chancellors of the Australian National University
Vice-Chancellors of the Australian National University
20th-century Australian public servants
Agricultural economists
People educated at Sydney Boys High School
University of Sydney alumni